These are the list of episodes that are aired on ABS-CBN's legal drama anthology Ipaglaban Mo! since its premiere airing on June 7, 2014. Special episodes of the show are aired every last Saturday of December.

List of episodes

(1992–1999)

Revival

2014

2015

2016

2017

2018

2019

2020

References

Lists of anthology television series episodes
Lists of Philippine drama television series episodes